Stillbirth Foundation Australia is an organization which aims to improve care and conditions for people who have experienced the stillbirth of a child as well as preventing stillbirth. Their main work is funding research on why stillbirth happens. They have also encouraged Australian companies to allow parents of stillborn children to have parental leave. It is the only charity in Australia dedicated to stillbirth research.

Personnel 
 Victoria Bowring, general manager

See also 
 Still Aware
 Stillbirth and Neonatal Death Society
 Now I Lay Me Down to Sleep (organization)
 Abigail's Footsteps

References

External links 
 Official website

Stillbirth organizations
2005 in Australia
Charities based in Australia